The Broken may refer to:

The Broken (film), a 2008 horror film directed by Sean Ellis
thebroken, a video podcast hosted by Kevin Rose and Dan Huard
The Broken, a 2010 single by progressive rock group Coheed and Cambria
The Broken (album), the debut album by Brokencyde from 2007
Broken (disambiguation)